Kurt Wallander is a fictional Swedish police inspector created by Swedish crime writer Henning Mankell (1948 – 2015). Wallander has been portrayed on screen by the actors Rolf Lassgård, Krister Henriksson, Sir Kenneth Branagh and Adam Pålsson.

Biography

Wallander was born in 1948. His mother died when he was about 14. After completing national service, he joined the police. As a young police officer, he was nearly killed when a drunk whom he was questioning stabbed him with a butcher's knife (this is mentioned in the account of his first case). He has a sister, Kristina. Wallander was once married, but his wife Mona left him and he has since had a difficult relationship with his rebellious only child, Linda, who barely survived a suicide attempt when she was fifteen. He also has issues with his father, an artist who has painted the same landscape 7,000 times for a living; the elder Wallander strongly disapproved of his son's decision to join the police force and frequently derides him for it.

Wallander is a great fan of opera; while in his car he regularly listens to recordings of famous opera singers such as Maria Callas, and when he can find the time goes to opera performances, sometimes crossing over to Copenhagen, Denmark for this purpose. At one time, Wallander had dreamed of making opera his life, leaving the police force and becoming the impresario of his friend, Sten Widén, a tenor who aspired to sing opera. But Widén's voice was not good enough and the dream came to naught—a crushing disappointment in Wallander's life (as in Widén's).

Inspector Wallander has few close friends and is known for his less-than-desirable lifestyle; he consumes too much alcohol and junk food, exercises very little, and sometimes struggles with anger. He frequently regards the crimes he investigates on a very personal level, throwing himself into catching criminals and going against the orders of his superiors to try to solve a case, often with negative effects on his emotional stability.

Over the years he has grown increasingly disillusioned with his work and often wonders whether he should have become a police officer at all. He was once falsely sued and harassed for police brutality and still lives with the guilt of having shot and killed a man in the fog, an act which drove him into depression and nearly led to his resignation.  His relationships with his colleagues are tentative; they are alternately amazed by his intellect and frustrated by his brusque manner and aggressive tactics.

He is frequently at loose ends socially and with his family. After the breakup of his marriage, he had an affair with Annette Brolin, the prosecutor with whom he was working on some cases — but she was married and had children, and would not consider divorcing for his sake ("Faceless Killers"). In later years, he maintains a somewhat inconsistent romantic relationship with Baiba Liepa, a woman in Riga, Latvia, whom he met while investigating a murder there, until it eventually dissolves.  Over the course of the series he is diagnosed with diabetes, and towards the end of his career he suffers from memory lapses, discovering he has developed Alzheimer's disease, with which his father was also afflicted.

Novels 
The following Kurt Wallander novels have been translated into English. They are listed in the order that they were originally published in Sweden:

Mördare utan ansikte (1991; English translation by Steven T. Murray: Faceless Killers, 1997)
Hundarna i Riga (1992; English translation by Laurie Thompson: The Dogs of Riga, 2001)
Den vita lejoninnan (1993; English translation by Laurie Thompson: The White Lioness, 1998)
Mannen som log (1994; English translation by Laurie Thompson: The Man Who Smiled, 2005)
Villospår (1995; English translation by Steven T. Murray: Sidetracked, 1999)
Den femte kvinnan (1996; English translation by Steven T. Murray: The Fifth Woman, 2000)
Steget efter (1997; English translation by Ebba Segerberg: One Step Behind, 2002)
Brandvägg (1998; English translation by Ebba Segerberg: Firewall, 2002)
Pyramiden (1999; short stories; English translation by Ebba Segerberg with Laurie Thompson: The Pyramid, 2008)
Handen (2004; novella; originally published in Dutch (2004) as Het Graf (The Grave). Published in Swedish, 2013. English translation by Laurie Thompson: An Event in Autumn, 2014)
Den orolige mannen (2009; English translation by Laurie Thompson:  The Troubled Man, 2011)

The following novel features Wallander's daughter Linda in the lead, while he is a secondary character:
Innan frosten (2002; English translation by Ebba Segerberg: Before the Frost, 2005)
It was intended as the first of a spinoff trilogy. However Mankell was so distraught after the suicide of Johanna Sällström, the actress playing the character at the time in the Swedish TV series, that he decided to abandon the series after only the first novel.

The order that the novels occur in the timeline of the series is shown below (with the title of the English translation shown in parentheses). Note that there is some overlap in the timeline among the novels as there are three separate series.

 Pyramiden (The Pyramid)
 Mördare utan ansikte (Faceless Killers)
 Hundarna i Riga (The Dogs of Riga)
 Den vita lejoninnan (The White Lioness)
 Mannen som log (The Man Who Smiled)
 Villospår (Sidetracked)
 Den femte kvinnan (The Fifth Woman)
 Steget efter (One Step Behind)
 Brandvägg (Firewall)
 Innan frosten (Before the Frost)
 Handen (An Event in Autumn)
 Den orolige mannen (The Troubled Man)

TV and film

Film series (Swedish)

Between 1994 and 2007, all nine Wallander novels published at the time were made into films in Sweden starring Rolf Lassgård as Wallander:

TV series (Swedish)

From 2005 to 2006, 13 new stories, starring Krister Henriksson as Kurt Wallander and Johanna Sällström as Linda Wallander, were produced. The first film, based on Before the Frost, was released in cinemas. The rest are original stories not based on any of Mankell's books, and were released on DVD, with the exception of Mastermind which was also released in cinemas.
 .
 .
 .
 .
 .
 .
 .
 .
 .
 .
 .
 .
 .
Two of these films were directed by BAFTA award-winning Swedish director Jonas Grimås, who outside Sweden is best known for his work on British television such as the 1990s crime drama Second Sight (Kingdom of the Blind) starring Clive Owen, police drama series Heartbeat, and Hamish Macbeth.

Yellow Bird announced in March 2008 that 13 new Swedish language Wallander films were to be made with Krister Henriksson. Production started in 2008. These new films were to have a more political slant than the previous films starring Henriksson.   The first production in the second series, was given a cinematic launch in Sweden on 9 January 2009 before being released on DVD.  The theme over the closing credits is "Quiet Night", sung by Anna Ternheim. The remaining were scheduled to be released on DVD during early 2010: 
 .
 .
 .
 .
 .
 .
 .
 .
 .
 .
 .
 .
 .

A third series consisting of six episodes was released in 2013. This is the last season with Krister Henriksson. In these final episodes, Kurt Wallander suffers from memory problems because of Alzheimer’s disease, and he cannot continue to work as a policeman.

 Den orolige mannen
 Försvunnen
 Sveket
 Saknaden
 Mordbrännaren
 Sorgfågeln.

TV series (British)

The novels have also been adapted as twelve television films for the BBC, produced by Yellow Bird and Left Bank Pictures. The series stars Kenneth Branagh as Wallander.  The episodes have not been filmed in the order in which the original novels were published, resulting in changes to the backstories of the lead characters in the films.  The first series consisted of the novels Sidetracked, Firewall and One Step Behind. These three were shot on location in Ystad in the summer of 2008, with a combined budget of £6 million ($12 million). They aired in late 2008 on the BBC.

A second series of Wallander adaptations was commissioned by the BBC from the same production team in 2008. Broadcast in January 2010, the second series was composed of adaptations of Faceless Killers, The Man Who Smiled, and The Fifth Woman.

The third series began shooting in Ystad and Riga, Latvia in the Summer of 2011 and continued into the winter.  Broadcast in July 2012, it consists of adaptations of An Event in Autumn, The Dogs of Riga and Before the Frost.  While the novel Before the Frost has Wallander's daughter Linda as its protagonist detective, the story was adapted for television so that Wallander himself became the lead.

The BBC Wallander series concluded in May 2016 with a three-episode fourth series consisting of an adaptation of The White Lioness and a two-episode adaptation of Mankell's final Wallander novel, The Troubled Man.

Special appearances
Mankell's friend and writer Jan Guillou used Kurt Wallander in the 10th book of his Carl Hamilton-series . Guillou and Mankell also co-wrote the Swedish crime-drama mini series Talismanen and here we also encounter Kurt Wallander as a supporting character, this time portrayed by actor Lennart Jähkel.

Young Wallander
Starting in September 2020, streaming service Netflix launched a new English-language series based on the character, entitled Young Wallander. The series depicts Wallander (Adam Pålsson) as a rookie detective in present-day Malmö, as opposed to the usual setting of Ystad. The show is not based on any of the novels, nor does it feature any of the familiar supporting characters from Mankell's works.

Young Wallander is a Swedish-UK co-production, with Pålsson the sole Swedish actor, amidst a mostly British cast. In November 2020, the series was renewed for a second season.

See also
Author Maj Sjöwall and Per Wahlöö's Swedish detective character Martin Beck

References

Further reading

External links 
Branagh's Wallander - Website relating to the BBC's English-language Wallander starring Kenneth Branagh
Official Henning Mankell site 
Comprehensive Henning Mankell fan site 
Kurt Wallander's Ystad
In the Footsteps of Wallander PDF document from Ystad Tourist Office with map of places referred to in the novels.
Article in Variety concerning plans to bring Wallander to British television
Yellow Bird site
Interesting TV on Wallander - Analysis of all three major Wallander Film/TV adaptations and associations with each of the Mankell novels.

Fictional Scandinavian people
Characters in crime novel series
Fictional Swedish police detectives
 
Thriller film characters
Book series introduced in 1991
Literary characters introduced in 1991